Ernest Walter Hives, 1st Baron Hives  (21 April 1886 – 24 April 1965), was the one-time head of the Rolls-Royce Aero Engine division and chairman of Rolls-Royce Ltd.

Hives was born in Reading, Berkshire to John and Mary Hives, living at 31 Christchurch Road from at least 1891 to 1901. During the Second World War he was closely involved with the design of the Merlin engine as well as numerous later Rolls-Royce jet engines. He began his working life in a local garage. However, in 1903 he got a job working at C.S. Rolls' car company, after fixing Rolls' car. He was widely known as "Hs", and signed thus.

Achievements
After becoming a chief test driver in 1908, he led the Rolls-Royce team in the Austrian Alpine Trial in 1913. During the First World War the company designed its first aero-engine, the Eagle, and Hives developed it successfully; by 1916 he was Head of the Experimental Department. In 1919 the Eagle powered the twin-engined Vickers Vimy bomber on the first direct flight across the Atlantic. In 1920 Hives was appointed MBE. Other notable engines were later developed under Hives' lead. Of these the Buzzard was the most important, leading to the ‘R’ series, which powered the Supermarine S.6 seaplanes that won the Schneider Trophy in 1929 and 1931 for Rolls-Royce, and most importantly the famous Merlin engine.

In 1936 he became the general works manager of the factory and a year later was elected to the board. He lived at 37, St. Chads Rd., Derby until around 1937, then at 'Hazeldene', Duffield. In 1937, thinking war would soon be inevitable, he prepared the firm for a massive production increase in Merlin engines by splitting facilities between engineering and production and developing shadow factories. As the Merlin powered Hurricanes, Spitfires and Lancasters (as well as the best forgotten Fairey Battle), this was a vitally strategic decision when war did come. Thanks to Hives no less than a hundred and sixty thousand Merlins were produced by 1945.

His team directive was "Work till it hurts and W. A. Robotham said that when he was attached to "this remarkable man" for a few (wartime) days I became completely exhausted and made absolutely no contribution towards easing his load. After visiting the Hillingdon Merlin factory, the night train from Glasgow to London arrived at Trent at the unearthly hour of 5.20 a.m. so (if you couldn't sleep on the train like Hives) walking with him round the Derby factory before breakfast was a gruelling experience. Robotham was responsible to Hives for the Car Division, and Hives supported Robotham in developing and manufacturing the Meteor tank engine. 

In 1941-42 Hives had decided 'to go all out for the gas turbine, to ensure the company a leading role in developing jet engines for civil and military aviation. In December 1942 when Rover was having problems with Frank Whittle and his company Power Jets in developing their first gas turbine engine, the Rolls-Royce Welland, Hives met with Spencer Wilks of Rover and arranged to exchange Rover's gas turbine business for Rolls-Royce's Nottingham factory producing  Rolls-Royce Meteor tank engines (which Rover were already producing). This exchange (effective 1 April 1943) gave Rolls-Royce (whose major product was piston aero engines) an entry into jet engine manufacture.

Vice-Chief of Air Staff Sir Wilfrid Freeman, one of the masterminds behind the dramatic advances in British aircraft production before and during World War II, paid tribute to Hives's dedication in a letter to his wife:

Hives became managing director in 1946 and chairman of Rolls-Royce from 1950 till 1957. He was Chairman of the National Council for Technological Awards from 1955 to 1960. He was appointed to the Order of the Companions of Honour in the 1943 Birthday Honours and on 7 July 1950 he was raised to the peerage as Baron Hives''', of Duffield in the County of Derby.

Robotham has a chapter on Hives (Chapter 21) in his own biography.

He played a critical role in the UK Nuclear Submarine programme. When the highly irascible but utterly pivotal U.S. Admiral Rickover visited the UK in 1957 to inspect the British nuclear design team at Rolls-Royce, Rickover was "at his obnoxious worst".  After one particularly difficult morning he was introduced to Lord Hives.

Personal life
He married Gertrude E Warwick (born 9 December 1890) in 1913.  His son, Pilot Officer Edward Ernest Hives, was killed in action flying with RAF Coastal Command in October 1940.

He retired in 1957 and died on 24 April 1965, aged 79, at the National Hospital for Nervous Diseases in Queen Square, London. He was succeeded in the barony by his son John.

His younger daughter, Philippa Ann Hives, married Judge Alexander Morrison in 1978.

Arms

References

Notes

Bibliography

Lumsden, Alec. British Piston Engines and their Aircraft. Marlborough, Wiltshire: Airlife Publishing, 2003. .
 Pugh, Peter. The Magic of a Name - The Rolls-Royce Story - The First 40 Years. Cambridge, England. Icon Books Ltd, 2000. 
 Furse, Anthony. Wilfrid Freeman: the genius behind Allied survival and air supremacy 1939 to 1945. Staplehurst. Spellmount, 2000. 
 Hennessy, Peter and Jinks, James. The Silent Deep Allen Lane 2015 
 
 Watson, W.R. The Derbyshire village of Duffield, past and present''. Chevin Books, 1991. 

1886 births
1965 deaths
Rolls-Royce people
Members of the Order of the Companions of Honour
Members of the Order of the British Empire
Royal Aeronautical Society Gold Medal winners
20th-century English businesspeople
Barons created by George VI